is a retired Japanese sprinter. He competed in the 100 metres and 4 × 100 metres relay at the 2000 Olympic Games. He was also selected as a reserve for the 100 metres at the 2007 World Championships, but he did not compete.

Achievements

Personal bests

References

External links

Shigeyuki Kojima at JAAF 
Shigeyuki Kojima at JOC 

1979 births
Living people
Sportspeople from Chiba Prefecture
Japanese male sprinters
Athletes (track and field) at the 2000 Summer Olympics
Olympic athletes of Japan
World Athletics Championships athletes for Japan
Athletes (track and field) at the 2006 Asian Games
Asian Games competitors for Japan
20th-century Japanese people
21st-century Japanese people